Maithripala Sirisena, 7th President of Sri Lanka (2015–2019); Member of the Sri Lankan Parliament from Polonnaruwa (1989–2015) (2020–Present).

Sri Lankan Parliarment

1989 Parliamentary General Election
Results of the 9th parliamentary election held on 15 February 1989 for the district of Polonnaruwa:

The following candidates were elected:
Hewa Gajaman Paththinige Nelson (UNP), 18,093 preference votes (pv); Maithripala Sirisena (SLFP), 13,652 pv; Seid Ahamed Abdul Majeed (UNP), 12,299 pv; C. A. Suriyaarachchi (UNP), 11,318 pv; and Samarasinghe Arachchilage Muthubanda (UNP), 10,336 pv.

1994 Parliamentary General Election
Results of the 10th parliamentary election held on 16 August 1994 for the district of Polonnaruwa:

The following candidates were elected:
Maithripala Sirisena (PA), 62,925 preference votes (pv); Rukman Senanayake (UNP), 45,648 pv; Hewa Gajaman Paththinige Nelson (UNP), 39,439 pv; Thilakarathne Bandara Mahalekam (PA), 26,465 pv; and Herath Mudiyanselage Nandasena Herath (PA), 26,213 pv.

2000 Parliamentary General Election
Results of the 11th parliamentary election held on 10 October 2000 for the district of Polonnaruwa:

The following candidates were elected:
Maithripala Sirisena (PA), 57,072 preference votes (pv); Earl Gunasekara (UNP), 56,213 pv; Hewa Gajaman Paththinige Nelson (UNP), 31,241 pv; Rukman Senanayake (UNP), 27,200 pv; and Herath Mudiyanselage Nandasena Herath (PA), 22,872 pv.

2001 Parliamentary General Election
Results of the 12th parliamentary election held on 5 December 2001 for the district of Polonnaruwa:

The following candidates were elected:
Earl Gunasekara (UNF), 57,957 preference votes (pv); Maithripala Sirisena (PA), 52,421 pv; Hewa Gajaman Paththinige Nelson (UNF), 41,822 pv; Ananda Sarath Kumara Rathnayake (PA), 40,384 pv; and Kapugamage Palle Mulle Sidney Jayaratne (UNF), 28,109 pv.

2004 Parliamentary General Election
Results of the 13th parliamentary election held on 2 April 2004 for the district of Polonnaruwa:

The following candidates were elected:
Maithripala Sirisena (UPFA-SLFP), 72,451 preference votes (pv); S. K. Subasinghe (UPFA-JVP), 61,580 pv; Siripala Gamalath (UPFA-SLFP), 47,085 pv; Earl Gunasekara (UNF-UNP), 38,681 pv; and C. A. Suriyaarachchi (UNF-UNP), 37,983 pv.

2010 Parliamentary General Election
Results of the 14th parliamentary election held on 8 April 2010 for the district of Polonnaruwa:

The following candidates were elected:
Maithripala Sirisena (UPFA-SLFP), 90,118 preference votes (pv); Ranasinghe Roshan (UPFA), 56,223 pv; Siripala Gamalath (UPFA-SLFP), 53,973 pv; C. A. Suriyaarachchi (UPFA), 44,356 pv; and Earl Gunasekara (UNF-UNP), 26,925 pv.

President

References

Maithripala Sirisena